Násedlovice is a municipality and village in Hodonín District in the South Moravian Region of the Czech Republic. It has about 900 inhabitants.

History
The first written mention of Násedlovice is from 1327. It was the seat of lower nobles with a fortress and a manor house. The last mention of the fortress in from 1626. From 1565, Násedlovice was owned by the Kaunitz family and joined to the Ždánice manor. After the Battle of White Mountain, their properties were confiscated and Ždánice manor with Násedlovice was acquired by Maximilian of Liechtenstein.

References

External links

Villages in Hodonín District
Moravian Slovakia